"Asteropeia" may also refer to a figure in Greek mythology, see Antinoe

Asteropeia is a genus of flowering plants. The genus contains 8 known species of shrubs and small trees, all endemic to Madagascar. It is the sole genus in family Asteropeiaceae. Members of the family are evergreen trees or shrubs.

Members of the family were separated from the Theaceae based on wood anatomy by the APG system, of 1998, and assigned to the order Caryophyllales in the clade core eudicots. The family consists of a single genus, Asteropeia, native to Madagascar.

According to the AP-Website it forms a clade together with the family  Physenaceae (also of Madagascar).

References

External links
 Asteropeiaceae in L. Watson and M.J. Dallwitz (1992 onwards). 
 The families of flowering plants descriptions, illustrations, identification, information retrieval. Version: 30 May 2006.
 links at CSDL
 NCBI Taxonomy Browser
 photographs of Asteropeia (Missouri Botanic Garden)

 
Endemic flora of Madagascar
Caryophyllales genera